Betul is a municipality in southern Madhya Pradesh, India. It is the administrative center of Betul district and forms the southernmost part of the Bhopal Division in the Betul (Lok Sabha constituency).

Name
During the early 20th century, Betul was known as Badnur. Betul—literally "without" (be) "cotton" (tool)—was named for its position outside the area's cottonfields.

History

Nearby Kherla was formerly the seat of an independent kingdom in the medieval and early modern period. Under Company Rule, its fort was permitted to fall into ruin. Badnur became the headquarters of Betul District in 1822. Surrounded by hills on all sides, it was used by the British for the exportation of coal. It supported two bazaars; the larger, Kothi Bazar, held 2015 people in the 1870s. At that time, the town had a circuit house, a dak bungalow, a caravanserai, jail, police station, pharmacy, and schools. Its population  was 3766.

Following independence, Betul lay near the geographical center point of the new country, which is now marked by a stone at Barsali. Betul was connected to the Delhi–Chennai line of the Indian rail network in the early 1950s. It now serves as a junction point, providing the only access to the Chindwara District on broad-gauge rail.

Geography

Climate

Demographics

During the 2011 Indian census, Betul had a population of 103,330. Males constitute 51.12% of the population, females 48.88%. Betul has an average literacy rate of 89.28%, higher than the national average of 74.04%. 10.82% of the population is under 6 years of age.

Economy
Betul District's economy is predominantly an agrarian one. Its dense woods also permit forestry. Its road and rail connections and good telecom services have led some to predict that Betul will become an advanced industrial district.

Currently, Betul District supports 7160 cottage industries capitalized at 1235.65 Lakhs and employing 17,682 people; 33 small-scale industries capitalized at 819.99 Lakhs and employing 667 people; and 5 medium- or large-scale industries with a total capitalization 1681.37 Lakhs and a workforce of 999 people. Of the 33 SSI's, 8 are agricultural, 13 are mineral-based, and 1 is forest-based. The five larger industrial plants are:
 M/s. Betul Oils & Flours Ltd., Kosmi Industrial Area (130.12 Lakhs), 
 M/s. Madhyavarta Ex-oil Ltd., Kosmi Industrial Area (595.00 Lakhs), 
 M/s. Adhishwar Oil & Fats Ltd. Chouthia, Multai (348.73 Lakhs), 
 M/s. Betul Tyre & Tube Industry Pvt. Ltd., Sohagpur (302.25 Lakhs), and
 M/s. Wearwell Tyre & Tube Industries, Panka, Amla (305.27 Lakhs).

Transport

Betul is connected to the broad-gauge Delhi–Chennai (Grand Trunk) line of the Indian rail network, which also communicates with Bhopal and Nagpur. Two new railway lines are also proposed - Betul - Chandur Bazar  and Betul -Harda -Indore. Betul Railway station has 94 trains, to various parts of country like Delhi, Chennai, Hyderabad, Bangalore, Jaipur, Lucknow, Kanpur, Bhopal, Indore, Harda, Jabalpur, Nagpur etc.

Betul is serviced by National Highway 46 and National Highway 47, also connecting it with Bhopal and Nagpur. National Highway 47 connects it to Harda  Indore as well. There are daily buses to Bhopal, Nagpur, Harda and Indore, as well as Jabalpur, Hoshangabad, and other cities. Betul's RTO code is MP48.

The tyre industry also uses the area's waterways for export to the United States, the UK, the Middle East, and Africa.The nearest airport is Nagpur.

Education 

In Betul, there are total 72 number of colleges. Some main colleges are as follows
 Govt Jaywanti Haksar P G College Betul
 Government polytechnic college  sonaghati Betul
 Bhimrao Ramrao Ambedkar College Of Education, Run By Shri  Ram Shiksha Parishad, Chakkar Road Ambedk
 Late Shri Nandkishore Singh Patel Memorial College, Near Link  Road, Sadar, Betul
 Netaji Subhas Chandra Bose College
 Shri Ram Pharmacy College Jamthi Betul
 Shri Balaji Institute of Technology & Management, Betul
In Betul, there are many schools for primary and secondary education. Some of the main schools are

 R D Public School, Kalapatha, Betul
 Satpuda Valley Public School, Sonaghati, Betul
 Kendriya Vidyalya Betul
 ELC English School
Rathore Collage and School

References

Sources
 
 

 
Cities and towns in Betul district
Cities in Madhya Pradesh